Mosquito is the fourth studio album by American indie rock band Yeah Yeah Yeahs, released on April 12, 2013, by Interscope Records. The lead single "Sacrilege" was released on February 26, 2013. "Despair" was released as the second single on July 19, 2013.

Karen O described the album as "extremely lo-fi", explaining: "We had a shitty drum machine, a shitty sampled keyboard, tons of delay on the vocals. There's a real tone, character, and style to it."

Promotion
The full album was posted on Noisey's YouTube page featuring a track-by-track interview with the band on April 2, 2013. On April 5, the band appeared on Late Show with David Letterman to perform "Sacrilege" accompanied by the gospel choir Broadway Inspirational Voices. Yeah Yeah Yeahs performed the songs "Mosquito" and "Sacrilege" on Jimmy Kimmel Live! on April 15.

A music video for the title track, directed by B. Shimbe Shim, debuted on May 8, 2013. The video for the second single "Despair" was directed by Patrick Daughters and premiered on June 21.

Reception

Critical response
Mosquito received generally positive reviews from music critics. At Metacritic, which assigns a normalized rating out of 100 to reviews from mainstream publications, the album received an average score of 75, based on 39 reviews, which indicates "generally favorable reviews".

Commercial performance
Mosquito entered the Billboard 200 at number five with 38,000 copies sold in its first week, earning the band their first top-10 album on the chart. The album debuted at number nine on the UK Albums Chart with first-week sales of 9,150 copies, becoming the band's third consecutive top-10 album.

Accolades
Mosquito was ranked number 30 on NMEs "50 Best Albums of 2013" list and number 40 on Vices "Top 50 Albums of 2013" list.

Track listing

Personnel
Credits adapted from the liner notes of the deluxe edition of Mosquito.

Yeah Yeah Yeahs
 Brian Chase – drums, cymbals, percussion, vocals
 Karen O – vocals, bass, keyboards
 Nick Zinner – guitars, bass, keyboards, vocals

Additional musicians

 David Andrew Sitek – bass 
 Money Mark – keyboards 
 Dr. Octagon – vocals 
 Debra Barsha – choir vocal arrangement 
 Michael McElroy – choir leader 
 Danielle Chambers – choir 
 Shayna Cook – choir 
 Bradley Dean – choir 
 Laura Dean – choir 
 Tanesha Gray – choir 
 Lucia Giannetta – choir 
 Renee Goldsberry – choir 
 Danielle L. Greaves – choir 
 Marva Hicks – choir 
 Zonya Johnson – choir 
 Chelsea Krombach – choir 
 Adriane Lenox – choir 
 Lisa Lynne Mathis – choir 
 Travis Morin – choir 
 Jesse Nager – choir 
 John Eric Parker – choir 
 Desiree Rodriguez – choir 
 Eliseo Roman – choir 
 Michael Seelbach – choir 
 Virginia Woodruff – choir

Technical

 Nick Launay – production ; recording, engineering
 David Andrew Sitek – production ; recording, engineering
 James Murphy – production ; recording, engineering
 Sam Spiegel – production ; recording, engineering
 Yeah Yeah Yeahs – production 
 Nick Zinner – mixing 
 Wes Fontenot – mixing, engineering 
 Manuel Calderon – engineering ; engineering assistance
 Abby Echiverri – mixing ; engineering 
 Zeph Sowers – recording, engineering
 Atom – engineering assistance
 Rudyard Lee Cullers – engineering assistance
 Nathan Eldridge – engineering assistance
 Matt Foster – engineering assistance
 Charles Godfrey – engineering assistance
 Matt Thornley – engineering assistance
 Craig Silvey – mixing
 Eduardo de la Paz – mixing assistance
 Greg Calbi – mastering

Artwork
 Beomsik Shimbe Shim – art
 Julian Gross – design, layout
 Karen O – concept
 Dan Martensen – back cover photo

Charts

Release history

References

2013 albums
Albums produced by Dave Sitek
Albums produced by James Murphy (electronic musician)
Albums produced by Nick Launay
Albums recorded at Sonic Ranch
Interscope Records albums
Polydor Records albums
Yeah Yeah Yeahs albums